Lygropia flavofuscalis is a moth in the family Crambidae. It was described by Snellen in 1887. It is found in Colombia and on Curaçao.

References

Moths described in 1887
Lygropia